Alton School is an independent Catholic day school on the outskirts of Alton, Hampshire for boys and girls from 6 months to 18 years. It has approximately 450 pupils of all faiths. Situated on a  campus, it has a nursery, prep, senior and 6th form.

History
Alton School was established in 1938 by the Sisters of Our Lady of Providence. Since then it has been located in the Anstey Manor House in Alton, Hampshire.

Curriculum
Senior School subjects are divided into Core, Additional and Extended which allows pupils to learn at their own paces. Pupils take ten GCSE subjects and may choose from a variety of electives including separate sciences, law, photography, geography, history, art and drama. All students take Religious Studies GCSE in year 10.

Activities
Some events and activities are organised jointly with sister Catholic school Salesian College in nearby Farnborough. The school hosts a joint Michaelmas ball with nearby More House School.

Notable alumni
Alison Goldfrapp - Vocalist of Goldfrapp
Ward Thomas - Country Singers

References

External links
Official school website
Profile on the ISC website
Stats page on BBC
Alton Nursery Ofsted Reports
ISI Inspection Reports

Girls' schools in Hampshire
Private schools in Hampshire
Roman Catholic private schools in the Diocese of Portsmouth
Educational institutions established in 1938
1938 establishments in England
Alton, Hampshire